The Dr. Thomas H. Avera House (also known as the Avera-Winston House) is a historic house located at 6600 Robertson Pond Road near Wendell, Wake County, North Carolina.

Description and history 
It was built about 1874, and is a two-story, T-shaped, Italianate style frame dwelling with Gothic design elements. Also on the property are the contributing privy, smokehouse, and dairy, all built about 1874. The house, facing north, is sited close to the road that has been cut deeply forming a steep slope up to the house lot.

It was listed on the National Register of Historic Places on September 11, 2003.

See also
 List of Registered Historic Places in North Carolina

References

Houses on the National Register of Historic Places in North Carolina
Houses completed in 1874
Gothic Revival architecture in North Carolina
Italianate architecture in North Carolina
Houses in Wake County, North Carolina
National Register of Historic Places in Wake County, North Carolina